Charles John Holt, Jr. (May 31, 1888 – January 18, 1951) was an American motion picture actor who was prominent in both silent and sound movies, particularly Westerns.

Early life
Holt was born in 1888 in the Fordham section of The Bronx, New York, the son of an Episcopal priest at St. James Church. When in Manhattan, he attended Trinity School. He was accepted into the Virginia Military Institute in 1909, but expelled for misbehavior in his second semester there.

Following Holt's father's death, the family moved to New York City, where Jack, his mother, and brother Marshall lived with his married sister, Frances.

Holt worked at various jobs including construction of the Pennsylvania Railroad's tunnel under the Hudson River and being a "surveyor, laborer, prospector, trapper, and stagecoach driver, among many other jobs" during an almost six-year stay in Alaska.

Military service 
Holt was prevented from serving in World War I because of "chronic foot problems" that resulted from frostbite that he suffered during his time in Alaska. On January 28, 1943, Holt reported for duty with the rank of captain in the Army Quartermaster Corps. He began training at Fort Francis E. Warren.

Film career

Holt began in Hollywood with stunt work and bit parts in serials and at Universal Pictures worked as a supporting player for Francis Ford and his brother John Ford, and Grace Cunard.

In his 1914 film debut, Holt rode a horse down a steep embankment into the Russian River in a scene for Salomy Jane. The stunt cracked some of Holt's ribs and injured the horse so badly that it had to be destroyed. The film, which was considered lost for years, was included in the DVD released 2011 anthology Treasures 5 The West 1898—1938 by the National Film Preservation Foundation after a print was discovered in Australia.

Jack Holt, with his dapper mustache, prominent jaw, and quick-with-his-fists manner, personified rugged masculinity. Holt became Columbia Pictures' most reliable leading man, and scored personal successes in three Frank Capra action dramas:  Submarine (1928), Flight (1929) and Dirigible (1931). Holt's no-nonsense characterizations were eclipsed by younger, tough-talking actors like James Cagney and Chester Morris, although he was still entrusted with tough-guy-with-a-heart-of-gold leads. Two mid-1930s features, Whirlpool and The Defense Rests, starred Holt opposite up-and-coming ingenue Jean Arthur.

Exhibitors had come to associate Jack Holt with rough-and-tumble action, and so Holt continued to work in low-budget crime dramas (mostly for Columbia) through 1940. The series came to an end when he argued with studio chief Harry Cohn. Cohn thought the actor so arrogant that he assigned Holt the leading role in a lowbrow 15-chapter serial, Holt of the Secret Service (1941). Holt — the star of longest standing with the studio — was insulted by Cohn's demotion and, although he turned in a professional performance in the serial, he walked out on both Cohn and Columbia.

Holt began freelancing at other studios, frequently appearing in outdoor and western fare. He would become an enduring member of the cowboy fraternity through Trail of Robin Hood (1950), a Roy Rogers western with guest appearances by Holt, Allan Lane, Tom Keene, Tom Tyler, Kermit Maynard, and Rex Allen.

Jack Holt's children established their own film careers. Tim Holt succeeded George O'Brien as the star of RKO Radio Pictures' "B" westerns, and co-starred with his father in The Treasure of the Sierra Madre (1948), with Jack as a grubby vagrant. Jennifer Holt played ingenues in low-budget features, mostly for Universal Pictures. The Holt family performed together on the "Drifty" episode of "All Star Western Theater" (KNX-CBS Pacific Network, 1946/47) as a father/son/daughter trio featuring a dramatic sketch and additional entertainment by Foy Willing and the Riders of the Purple Sage.

Personal life 
Holt married divorcee Margaret Wood in 1918. She obtained a divorce in Mexico in 1932, but on January 9, 1940, a judge in Los Angeles ruled that the divorce was invalid. Her father, tycoon Henry Morton Stanley-Wood, disowned her because she married an actor; they later made up after he had lost most of his money in the Great Depression. She already had a daughter when they married, and together they had a son, Charles John Holt III, and a daughter, Elizabeth Marshall Holt. Better known as Tim and Jennifer respectively, both of them became actors in western films.
Holt was a lifetime member of the Society of Colonial Wars, admitted to the California Society on July 13, 1928.

Death

Holt died in 1951 of a heart attack, at age 62.

Contribution
Holt has a star on the Hollywood Walk of Fame at 6313-½ Hollywood Blvd for his contribution to the motion picture industry. 

Margaret Mitchell, although having no say in the casting for Gone With the Wind (1939), expressed her preference of Jack Holt as Rhett Butler, because her personal favorite, Charles Boyer, had a French accent.

Filmography
Salomy Jane (1914) as Solitaire-Playing Cowboy in Saloon (uncredited)
The Master Key (1914, Serial) as Donald Faversham
The Broken Coin (1915, Serial) as Captain Williams
Jewel (1915) as Nat Bonnell
The Dumb Girl of Portici (1916) as Conde

Naked Hearts (1916) as Howard
Liberty (1916, Serial) as Captain Bob Rutledge
Saving the Family Name (1916) as Jansen Winthrop
The Chalice of Sorrow (1916) (uncredited)
The Black Sheep of the Family (1916) as Kenneth Carmont
Joan the Woman (1916) (uncredited)
Patria (1917, Serial)
The Cost of Hatred (1917) as Huertez
Sacrifice (1917) as Paul Ekald
Giving Becky a Chance (1917) as Tom Fielding
The Inner Shrine (1917) as Viscount D'Arcourt
The Little American (1917) as Karl von Austreim
The Call of the East (1917) as Alan Hepburn
The Secret Game (1917) as Maj. John Northfield
The Hidden Pearls (1918) as Robert Garvin
The Claw (1918) as Maurice Stair
One More American (1918) as Sam Potts
Headin' South (1918)
Love Me (1918) as Gordon Appleby
The Honor of His House (1918) as Robert Farlow
The White Man's Law (1918) as Sir Harry Falkland
The Iron Claw (1916, Serial) as Maurice Stair
A Desert Wooing (1918) as Barton Masters
Green Eyes (1918) as Pearson Hunter
The Marriage Ring (1918) as Rodney Heathe
The Road Through the Dark (1918) as Duke Karl
The Squaw Man (1918) as Cash Hawkins
Cheating Cheaters (1919) as Tom Palmer
A Midnight Romance (1919) as Roger Sloan
For Better, for Worse (1919) as Crusader
The Woman Thou Gavest Me (1919) as Lord Raa
A Sporting Chance (1919) as Paul Sayre
The Woman Michael Married (1919) as Michael Ordsway
The Life Line (1919) as Jack Hearne, the Romany Rye
Kitty Kelly, M.D. (1919) as Bob Lang
Victory (1919) as Axel Heyst
The Best of Luck (1920) as Kenneth, Lord Glenayr
Crooked Streets (1920) as Rupert O'Dare
Held by the Enemy (1920) as Col. Charles Prescott
The Sins of Rosanne (1920) as Sir Dennis Harlenden
Midsummer Madness (1920) as Bob Meredith
All Soul's Eve (1921) as Roger Heath
Ducks and Drakes (1921) as Rob Winslow
The Lost Romance (1921) as Mark Sheridan
The Mask (1921) as Kenneth Traynor / Handsome Jack
After the Show (1921) as Larry Taylor
 The Grim Comedian (1921) as Harvey Martin
The Call of the North (1921) as Ned Trent
Bought and Paid For (1922) as Robert Stafford
North of the Rio Grande (1922) as Bob Haddington
While Satan Sleeps (1922) as Phil
The Man Unconquerable (1922) as Robert Kendall
On the High Seas (1922) as Jim Dorn
Making a Man (1922) as Horace Winsby
Nobody's Money (1923) as John Webster
The Tiger's Claw (1923) as Sam Sandell
A Gentleman of Leisure (1923) as Robert Pitt
Hollywood (1923) as himself
The Cheat (1923) as Dudley Drake
The Marriage Maker (1923) as Lord Stonbury
Don't Call It Love (1923) as Richard Parrish
The Lone Wolf (1924) as Michael Lanyard
Wanderer of the Wasteland (1924) as Adam Larey
Empty Hands (1924) as Grimshaw
North of 36 (1924) as Don McMasters
Eve's Secret (1925) as Duke of Poltava
The Thundering Herd (1925) as Tom Doan
The Light of Western Stars (1925) as Gene Stewart
Wild Horse Mesa (1925) as Chane Weymer
The Ancient Highway (1925) as Cliff Brant
The Enchanted Hill (1926) as Lee Purdy
Sea Horses (1926) as George Glanville
The Blind Goddess (1926) as Hugh Dillon
Born to the West (1926) as 'Colorado' Dare Rudd
Forlorn River (1926) as Nevada
Man of the Forest (1926) as Milt Dale
The Mysterious Rider (1927) as Bent Wade
The Tigress (1927) as Winston Graham, Earl of Eddington
The Warning (1927) as Tom Fellows / Col. Robert Wellsley
The Smart Set (1928) as Nelson
The Vanishing Pioneer (1928) as Anthony Ballard / John Ballard
Court-Martial (1928) as James Camden
The Water Hole (1928) as Philip Randolph
Submarine (1928) as Jack Dorgan
Avalanche (1928) as Jack Dunton
Sunset Pass (1929) as Jack Rock
The Donovan Affair (1929) as Insp. Killian
Father and Son (1929) as Frank Fields
Flight (1929) as Panama Williams
Vengeance (1930) as John Meadham
The Border Legion (1930) as Jack Kells
Hell's Island (1930) as Mac
The Squealer (1930) as Charles Hart
The Last Parade (1931) as Cookie Leonard
Dirigible (1931) as Jack Bradon
Subway Express (1931) as Inspector Killian
White Shoulders (1931) as Gordon Kent
Fifty Fathoms Deep (1931) as Tim Burke
 A Dangerous Affair (1931) as Lt. McHenry
Maker of Men (1931) as Coach Dudley
Behind the Mask (1932) as Jack Hart aka Quinn
 War Correspondent (1932) as Jim Kenyon
 This Sporting Age (1932) as Capt. John Steele
Man Against Woman (1932) as Johnny McCloud
Hollywood Speaks (1932) as himself
When Strangers Marry (1933) as Steve Rand
The Woman I Stole (1933) as Jim Bradler
The Wrecker (1933) as Chuck Regan
Master of Men (1933) as Buck Garrett
Whirlpool (1934) as Buck Rankin
Black Moon (1934) as Stephen Lane
The Defense Rests (1934) as Matthew Mitchell
I'll Fix It (1934) as Bill Grimes
 The Best Man Wins (1935) as Nick Roberts
Storm Over the Andes (1935) as Bob Kent
The Unwelcome Stranger (1935) as Howard W. Chamberlain
The Awakening of Jim Burke (1935) as Jim Burke
The Littlest Rebel (1935) as Col. Morrison
Dangerous Waters (1936) as Jim Marlowe
San Francisco (1936) as Jack Burley
Crash Donovan (1936) as 'Crash' Donovan
End of the Trail (1936) as Dale Brittenham
North of Nome (1936) as John Raglan
Trouble in Morocco (1937) as Paul Cluett
Roaring Timber (1937) as Jim Sherwood
Outlaws of the Orient (1937) as Chet Eaton
Trapped by G-Men (1937) as G-Man Martin Galloway, Posing as Bill Donovan
 Under Suspicion (1937) as Robert Bailey
Making the Headlines (1938) as Police Lt. Lewis Nagel
Flight into Nowhere (1938) as Jim Horne
 Reformatory (1938) as Robert Dean
Crime Takes a Holiday (1938) as Walter Forbes
 The Strange Case of Dr. Meade (1938) as Dr. Meade
Whispering Enemies (1939) as Stephen Brewster
Trapped in the Sky (1939) as Major
Fugitive at Large (1939) as Tom Farrow / George Storm
Hidden Power (1939) as Dr. Garfield
Outside the Three-Mile Limit (1940) as Treasury Agent Conway
Passport to Alcatraz (1940) as George Hollister
Fugitive from a Prison Camp (1940) as Sheriff Lawson
The Great Plane Robbery (1940) as Mike Henderson
The Great Swindle (1941) as Jack Regan
Holt of the Secret Service (1941, Serial) as Jack Holt / Nick Farrell
Thunder Birds (1942) as Colonel MacDonald
Northwest Rangers (1942) as Duncan Frazier
Cat People (1942) as The Commodore
They Were Expendable (1945) as General Martin
My Pal Trigger (1946) as Brett Scoville
Flight to Nowhere (1946) as FBI Agent Bob Donovan
The Chase (1946) as Cmdr. Davidson
Renegade Girl (1946) as Maj. Barker
The Wild Frontier (1947) as Charles 'Saddles' Barton
The Treasure of the Sierra Madre (1948) as Flophouse Bum (uncredited)
The Arizona Ranger (1948) as Rawhide Morgan
The Gallant Legion (1948) as Capt. Banner
The Strawberry Roan (1948) as Walt Bailey
Loaded Pistols (1948) as Dave Randall
The Last Bandit (1949) as Mort Pemberton
Brimstone (1949) as Marshal Walter Greenslide
Task Force (1949) as Captain Reeves
Red Desert (1949) as Deacon Smith
The Daltons' Women (1950) as Clint Dalton – Mike Leonard
Return of the Frontiersman (1950) as Sheriff Sam Barrett
Trail of Robin Hood (1950) as himself
King of the Bullwhip (1950) as Banker James Kerrigan
Across the Wide Missouri (1951) as Bear Ghost (final film role)

References

External links

 
 
 Photographs and literature on Jack Holt

1888 births
1951 deaths
20th-century American male actors
Academy of Motion Picture Arts and Sciences founders
American male film actors
American male silent film actors
Male Western (genre) film actors
Male actors from Virginia
People from Winchester, Virginia
United States Army Cavalry Branch personnel
United States Army personnel of World War II
Military personnel from New York (state)